1930 Országos Bajnokság I (men's water polo) was the 24th water polo championship in Hungary. There were nine teams who played one-round match for the title.

Final list 

* M: Matches W: Win D: Drawn L: Lost G+: Goals earned G-: Goals got P: Point

2. Class 

Eastern Division: 1. NSC 10, 2. Orosházi TK 8, 3. Egri TE 6, 4. Debreceni EAC 4, 5. Postás SE 2, 6. Debreceni UE 0 points.

Western Division: 1. Pécsi AC 7, 2. Tatabányai SC 6, 3. MAFC 5, 4. Kaposvári Turul 2, 5. Pannonia UE Sopron 0 points.

Final: NSC-PAC 6:5

Sources 
Gyarmati Dezső: Aranykor (Hérodotosz Könyvkiadó és Értékesítő Bt., Budapest, 2002.)
Sport-évkönyv 1930

1930 in water polo
1930 in Hungarian sport
Seasons in Hungarian water polo competitions